Members of the Arizona Legislature are elected from 30 districts, each of which elect one senator and two representatives. Members of both chambers serve two-year terms. Since 1993, all legislators are term limited to eight consecutive years in office, but can run again after two years or run for the opposite house than the one in which they serve.

The 30 legislative districts in Arizona:

 Arizona's 1st legislative district
 Arizona's 2nd legislative district
 Arizona's 3rd legislative district
 Arizona's 4th legislative district
 Arizona's 5th legislative district
 Arizona's 6th legislative district
 Arizona's 7th legislative district
 Arizona's 8th legislative district
 Arizona's 9th legislative district
 Arizona's 10th legislative district
 Arizona's 11th legislative district
 Arizona's 12th legislative district
 Arizona's 13th legislative district
 Arizona's 14th legislative district
 Arizona's 15th legislative district
 Arizona's 16th legislative district
 Arizona's 17th legislative district
 Arizona's 18th legislative district
 Arizona's 19th legislative district
 Arizona's 20th legislative district
 Arizona's 21st legislative district
 Arizona's 22nd legislative district
 Arizona's 23rd legislative district
 Arizona's 24th legislative district
 Arizona's 25th legislative district
 Arizona's 26th legislative district
 Arizona's 27th legislative district
 Arizona's 28th legislative district
 Arizona's 29th legislative district
 Arizona's 30th legislative district

References

Legislative districts